Georgian Byzantine Rite Catholics, or members of the Georgian Greek Catholic Church, are Catholics from the Georgian people who practice the Byzantine Rite in Old Georgian, which is also the liturgical language of the Georgian Orthodox Church.

History
During the 19th century, when almost all Georgian Catholics were of the Roman or Armenian Rites, many wished to attend the Byzantine Rite in Old Georgian, as is traditional in the Georgian Orthodox Church. 

The House of Romanov, in addition to ordering the forced Russification of the Georgian people and of their Church, viewed and treated the Eastern Catholic Churches, with the grudging exception of the Armenian Catholic Church, as illegal and even treasonous organizations. Accordingly, Georgian people who wished to become Catholics overwhelmingly joined the Armenian Catholic Diocese of Artvin, which had been set up in Russian Transcaucasia.

In 1861, in Istanbul, former Mekhitarist priest Fr. Peter Kharischirashvili (Pétre Kharistshirashvili) founded the Servites of the Immaculate Conception, for both for male and female monastics. They served Georgian Greek Catholics living in the Ottoman Empire and at Montauban, France. 

Only after Tsar Nicholas II grudgingly granted religious toleration during the Russian Revolution of 1905 did Catholics in Georgia feel able to adopt the Byzantine Rite.

In the brief period of Georgian independence between 1918 and 1921, some influential Georgian Orthodox expressed an interest in union with the Holy See, and an envoy was sent from Rome in 1919 to examine the situation. As a result of the onset of civil war and Soviet occupation, this came to nothing.

Some have treated Catholics within the Georgian Catholic Church who follow the Byzantine Rite as a separate particular Church with either 1861 or 1917 as the date of reunion with Rome. Reader Methodios Stadnik says that, in the 1930s, they had an Exarch, Fr. Shio Batmanishvili, and that an apostolic exarchate specifically for Georgian Greek Catholics had been established.

In The Forgotten: Catholics of the Soviet Union Empire from Lenin through Stalin, Father Christopher Zugger says that in the early 1920s nine missionaries of the Servites of the Immaculate Conception in Constantinople, headed by Bishop Shio Batmanishvili, came to Georgia to further establish the Byzantine Rite there, and that by 1929 their faithful had grown to 8,000. Tragically, their mission came to an end with the arrests of Exarch Shio and his priests in 1928, their imprisonment at Solovki prison camp, and their subsequent murder by Joseph Stalin's NKVD at Sandarmokh in 1937. Fr. Zugger cites a 1936 report that, "the Byzantine Catholic Church of Georgia had two communities, served by a bishop and four priests, with 8,000 believers", figures very similar to what elsewhere he gives as the 1929 situation.

Fr. Zugger does not state that the Georgian Byzantine Catholics were ever formally established as an autonomous particular Church, and no mention of the erection of such a jurisdiction for Byzantine Georgian Catholics exists in the Acta Apostolicae Sedis, the official gazette of the Holy See. There is no evidence therefore that the Georgian Catholics of Byzantine Rite constituted at any time an autonomous (sui iuris) Church, since canon 27 of the Code of Canons of the Eastern Churches defines these Churches as under a hierarchy of their own and recognized as autonomous by the supreme authority of the Church.

These congregations are long extinct, although some of their members were still alive in the late 1950s. The building that housed the male congregation, in Feriköy district, still stands in Istanbul, now in private ownership. Some clergy still serve a parish in Constantinople, giving Georgian Catholics in the city the possibility to worship in accordance with the Georgian Byzantine rite. This church, Notre-Dame de Lourdes, is still in service, although in the hands of Italian Catholic priests, gravestones in Georgian can still be seen in its courtyard.

Until 1994, the annual publication Catholic Almanac used to list "Georgian" among the Byzantine Rites or autonomous particular Churches. This was abandoned in 1995.

The largest community of Georgian Greek Catholics is in Gori. They are not organized, however as an Eastern Catholic Church in their own right (“sui juris”).

See also
Catholic Church in Georgia

References

Sources 
 
 Oriente Cattolico (Vatican City: The Sacred Congregation for the Eastern Churches, 1974)
 Annuario Pontificio
 Eastern Catholic Communities without Hierarchies

External links
Article on Eastern Catholic communities by Ronald Roberson on the CNEWA web site

Eastern Catholic Churches